Piedmontese (autonym:   or) is a language spoken by some 2,000,000 people mostly in Piedmont, a region of Northwest Italy. Although considered by most linguists a separate language, in Italy it is often mistakenly regarded as an Italian dialect. It is linguistically included in the Gallo-Italic languages group of Northern Italy (with Lombard, Emilian, Ligurian and Romagnolo), which would make it part of the wider western group of Romance languages, which also includes French, Occitan, and Catalan. It is spoken in the core of Piedmont, in northwestern Liguria, near Savona and in Lombardy (some municipalities in the westernmost part of Lomellina near Pavia).

It has some support from the Piedmont regional government but is considered a dialect rather than a separate language by the Italian central government.

Due to the Italian diaspora Piedmontese has spread in the Argentinian Pampas, where many immigrants from Piedmont settled. The Piedmontese language is also spoken in some states of Brazil, along with the Venetian language.

History 
The first documents in the Piedmontese language were written in the 12th century, the sermones subalpini, when it was extremely close to Occitan. Literary Piedmontese developed in the 17th and 18th centuries, but it did not gain literary esteem comparable to that of French or Italian, other languages used in Piedmont. Nevertheless, literature in Piedmontese has never ceased to be produced: it includes poetry, theatre pieces, novels, and scientific work.

Current status 
In 2004, Piedmontese was recognised as Piedmont's regional language by the regional parliament, although the Italian government has not yet recognised it as such. In theory, it is now supposed to be taught to children in school, but this is happening only to a limited extent.

The last decade has seen the publication of learning materials for schoolchildren, as well as general-public magazines. Courses for people already outside the education system have also been developed. In spite of these advances, the current state of Piedmontese is quite grave, as over the last 150 years the number of people with a written active knowledge of the language has shrunk to about 2% of native speakers, according to a recent survey. On the other hand, the same survey showed Piedmontese is still spoken by over half the population, alongside Italian. Authoritative sources confirm this result, putting the figure between 2 million (Assimil, IRES Piemonte and 3 million speakers (Ethnologue) out of a population of 4.2 million people.  Efforts to make it one of the official languages of the Turin 2006 Winter Olympics were unsuccessful.

Regional variants 

Piedmontese is divided into three major groups

 Western which include the dialects of Turin and Cuneo.
 Eastern which in turn is divided into south-eastern (Astigiano, Roero, Monregalese, High Montferrat, Langarolo, Alessandrino) and north-eastern (Low Montferrat, Biellese, Vercellese, Valsesiano).
 Canavese, spoken in the Canavese region in north-western Piedmont.

The variants can be detected in the variation of the accent and variation of words. It is sometimes difficult to understand a person that speaks a different Piedmontese from the one you are used to, as the words or accents are not the same.

Eastern and western group 
The Eastern Piedmontese group is more phonologically evolved than its western counterpart.

Although this development is shared partially (in the case of the infinitive time) also by most of the western dialects, including the Turin one, that is the most spoken dialect of western piedmontese (and also of the whole piedmontese language).   

A morphological variation that sharply divides east and west is the indicative imperfect conjugation of irregular verbs, in the east is present the suffix ava/iva, while in the west is asìa/isìa.

And different conjugation of the present simple of the irregular verbs: dé, andé, sté (to give, to go, to stay).

Phonology

Consonants 

Vowels 

Allophones of // are [] in stressed syllables.

Alphabet 
Piedmontese is written with a modified Latin alphabet. The letters, along with their IPA equivalent, are shown in the table below.

Certain digraphs are used to regularly represent specific sounds as shown below.

All other combinations of letters are pronounced as written.

Numbers

Characteristics 
Some of the characteristics of the Piedmontese language are:

 The presence of clitic so-called verbal pronouns for subjects, which give a Piedmontese verbal complex the following form: (subject) + verbal pronoun + verb, as in (mi) i von 'I go'. Verbal pronouns are absent only in the imperative form.
 The bound form of verbal pronouns, which can be connected to dative and locative particles (a-i é 'there is', i-j diso 'I say to him').
 The interrogative form, which adds an enclitic interrogative particle at the end of the verbal form (Veus-to…? 'Do you want to...?'])
 The absence of ordinal numerals higher than 'sixth', so that 'seventh' is col che a fà set 'the one which makes seven'.
 The existence of three affirmative interjections (that is, three ways to say yes): si, sè (from Latin sic est, as in Italian);  é (from Latin est, as in Portuguese); òj (from Latin hoc est, as in Occitan, or maybe hoc illud, as in Franco-Provençal, French and Old Catalan and Occitan).
 The absence of the voiceless postalveolar fricative  (like the sh in English sheep), for which an alveolar S sound (as in English sun) is usually substituted.
 The existence of an S-C combination pronounced [stʃ].
 The existence of a velar nasal [ŋ] (like the ng in English going), which usually precedes a vowel, as in lun-a 'moon'.
 The existence of the third Piedmontese vowel Ë, which is very short (close to the vowel in English sir).
 The absence of the phonological contrast that exists in Italian between short (single) and long (double) consonants, for example, Italian fata 'fairy' and fatta 'done (F)'.
 The existence of a prosthetic Ë sound when consonantal clusters arise that are not permitted by the phonological system. So 'seven stars' is pronounced set ëstèile (cf. stèile 'stars').

Piedmontese has a number of varieties that may vary from its basic koiné to quite a large extent. Variation includes not only departures from the literary grammar, but also a wide variety in dictionary entries, as different regions maintain words of Frankish or Lombard origin, as well as differences in native Romance terminology. Words imported from various languages are also present, while more recent imports tend to come from France and from Italian.

A variety of Piedmontese was Judeo-Piedmontese, a dialect spoken by the Piedmontese Jews until the Second World War.

Lexical comparison

Lexical comparison with other Romance languages and English:

References

Further reading

External links 

Cultural Association "Nòste Rèis": features online Piedmontese courses for Italian, French, English, and Spanish speakers with drills and tests
Piemunteis.it - Online resources about piedmontese language: poems, studies, audio, free books
Piemontese basic lexicon (several dialects) at the Global Lexicostatistical Database
Omniglot's entry on Piedmontese

 
Gallo-Italic languages
Languages of Piedmont